Recea is a village in Strășeni District, Moldova. The village has a total area of 24.89 km2, with a total perimeter of 33.37 km.

Demographic data
In 1997, the population of the Recea was estimated to 3150 inhabitants. According to the census of 2004, the population of is 2633 inhabitants, out of which 48.23% are men and 51.77% women. The ethnic structure of the population is as follows: 98.90% - Romanians, 0.27% - Ukrainians, 0.49% - Russians, 0.04% - Gagauzians, 0.11% - Bulgarians, 0.04% - Rroma, 0.15% - other ethnicities.

939 households were registered in the commune.

Notable people
 Gheorghe Buruiană

References

Villages of Strășeni District